The Brasil Open is an international badminton tournament held annually in Brazil. A part of the BWF Grand Prix tournaments, it is one of the main events in the Brazilian badminton calendar. The first tournament was held on 5–8 August 2014 in Rio de Janeiro and offered a total prize money of US$50,000.

Past winners

References 

2016
2015
2014

Badminton tournaments in Brazil
Recurring sporting events established in 2014